Hugh Boyd (17651795) was an Irish politician.

Boyd was educated at Trinity College, Dublin. From 1794 until his death, he was MP for Antrim County.

References

Alumni of Trinity College Dublin
Irish MPs 1790–1797
Members of the Parliament of Ireland (pre-1801) for County Antrim constituencies
1765 births
1795 deaths